Michael Gallagher (born in New York) is an American writer who has contributed to several comic books, as well as to the satire magazine Mad, to which he has contributed several two-page gags since the mid-1990s. He is the son of cartoonist John Gallagher, as well as the nephew of George Gately, creator of the comic strip Heathcliff. Besides Mad, Gallagher has contributed to Sonic the Hedgehog (especially in its earlier, more slapstick years), as well as a comic book series based on the TV show ALF, and several works for both Marvel Comics and Archie Comics. Gallagher commented on his three-year run on Guardians of the Galaxy: "It was very cool to have the 'past' Marvel Universe to play with in such a unique way and bend it to my will, and Kevin [West]'s pencils were to die for. But the characters you inherit arrive with personalities, powers, and quirks which must (and should) continue. And in this case, several vital subplots and storylines were still in progress."

References

External links
 Complete list of Gallagher's work for MAD Magazine

American comics writers
American satirists
American parodists
Living people
Mad (magazine) people
Writers from New York (state)
1951 births